Dany may refer to:

People with the name

Given name
A form of the Hebrew words and names daniyyel דניאל (« God is my Judge ») or dan דָּן (« judgement » or « he judged »)
Dany Abounaoum (born 1969), Lebanese alpine skier
Dany Bahar (born 1971), Swiss businessman
Dany Bébel-Gisler (1935–2003), Guadeloupean writer
Dany Bédar, French Canadian singer
Dany Bill (born 1973), Canadian kickboxer
Dany Boon (born 1966), real name Daniel Faid Hamidou, French comedian and filmmaker
Dany Bouchard (born 1967), Canadian cross-country skier
Dany Brand (born 1996), Swiss hurdler
Dany Brillant (born 1965), French musician
Dany Bustros (1959–1998), Lebanese belly dancer and actress
Dany Carrel (born 1932), real name Yvonne Suzanne Chazelles de Chaxel, French actress
Dany Chamoun (1934–1990), Lebanese politician
Dany Cooper, Australian film editor
Dany Cotton (born 1969), British firefighter
Dany Cure (born 1990), Venezuelan footballer
Dany da Silva (born 1993), Swiss footballer
Dany Doriz (born 1941), real name Daniel Dorisse, French jazz musician
Dany Dauberson (1925–1979), French singer and actress
Dany-Robert Dufour (born 1947), French philosopher
Dany Engobo (born 1955), Republic of the Congo musician
Dany Franchi (born 1990), Italian electric blues musician
Dany Garcia (born 1968), American film producer
Dany Gonçalves (born 1985), Portuguese sprinter
Dany Haddad (born 1960), Lebanese fencer
Dany Heatley (born 1981), Canadian ice hockey player, for the Ottawa Senators
Dany Kane (1969–2000), Canadian criminal
Dany Lademacher (born 1950), Belgian guitar player
Dany Laferrière (born 1953), Haitian-Canadian novelist
Dany Leviatan (born 1942), Israeli mathematician
Dany Locati (born 1977), Italian skeleton racer
Dany Marques (born 1991), Portuguese footballer
Dany Maury (born 1994), Cameroonian footballer
Dany Mendes Ribeiro (born 1988), Cape Verdean footballer
Dany Morin (born 1985), Canadian politician and businessman
Dany Mota Carvalho (born 1998), Luxembourgian-born Portuguese footballer
Dany N'Guessan (born 1987), French footballer
Dany Nounkeu (born 1986), Cameroonian footballer
Dany Pen (born 1986), Cambodian-born Canadian artist, activist, and educator
Dany Priso (born 1994), French rugby union player
Dany Luis Quintero (born 1984), Cuban footballer
Dany Rigoulot (born 1944), French figure skater
Dany Robin (1927–1995), French actress
Dany Roland (born 1962), Argentine-born Brazilian musician
Dany Roussin (born 1985), Canadian ice hockey centre
Dany Ryser (born 1957), Swiss football manager
Dany Saadia (born 1973), Mexican filmmaker and businessman
Dany Sabourin (born 1980), Canadian ice hockey goaltender
Dany Saputra (born 1991), Indonesian footballer
Dany Saval (born 1942), real name Danielle Nadine Suzanne Savalle, French actress
Dany Silva, Cape Verdean musician
Dany Stanišić, Serbian sailor
Dany Toussaint, 2006 Haitian politician
Dany Tuijnman (1915–1992), full name Daniël Sebastiaan Tuijnman, Dutch politician
Dany Vandenbossche (1956–2013), Belgian politician
Dany Verissimo (born 1982), French actress
Dany Verlinden (born 1963), real name Daniël Verdlinden, Belgian goalkeeper
Dany Verner (born 1977), Canadian sledge hockey player 
Dany Wilson (1982–2011), Jamaican male volleyball player

Other uses of the name
Dany (comics) (born 1943), the pseudonym of Daniel Henrotin, a Belgian comics artist
Vichara Dany, Cambodian actress who debuted in 1967

Arts, entertainment, and media
Dany (film), a 2001 Indian Malayalam film
Daenerys Targaryen, nicknamed Dany, a character from the fantasy series A Song of Ice and Fire and its TV adaptation Game of Thrones

Other uses
District Attorney of New York County, or DANY, New York

See also
Dani (disambiguation)
Danny (disambiguation)